St. Thomas Episcopal Church is a historic church in Glassboro, Gloucester County, New Jersey. It was built in 1846 and added to the National Register of Historic Places in 1975.

See also
National Register of Historic Places listings in Gloucester County, New Jersey

References

External links

Churches completed in 1846
19th-century Episcopal church buildings
Episcopal church buildings in New Jersey
Churches on the National Register of Historic Places in New Jersey
Gothic Revival church buildings in New Jersey
Churches in Gloucester County, New Jersey
Glassboro, New Jersey
National Register of Historic Places in Gloucester County, New Jersey
1846 establishments in New Jersey
New Jersey Register of Historic Places